Diego Ramírez Deschamps (born October 4, 1981) is a Mexican former footballer and manager who last coached the Mexico under-20 national team. He is the son of former footballer and manager Jesús Ramírez.

Career
Ramírez began his career with Atlante, debuting on February 5, 2000, in a 4–0 loss to Puebla.

He was sent to Monterrey at the beginning of the Aperura 2006 tournament, but failed to see enough action. Ramírez returned to Atlante in 2008, however he suffered a knee injury during his time with Monterrey from which he could not fully recover, which ultimately forced him to retire from football.

References

External links
 
 Ascenso MX Profile

1981 births
Living people
Liga MX players
Atlante F.C. footballers
C.F. Monterrey players
Association football defenders
Footballers from Mexico City
Mexican footballers
Mexican people of French descent